The territory of Lithuania is divided into 10 counties (Lithuanian: singular apskritis, plural apskritys), all named after their capitals. The counties are divided into 60 municipalities (Lithuanian: singular savivaldybė, plural savivaldybės): 9 city municipalities, 43 district municipalities and 8 municipalities. Each municipality is then divided into elderates (Lithuanian: singular seniūnija, plural seniūnijos). This division was created in 1994 and slightly modified in 2000. 

Until 2010, the counties were administered by county governors (Lithuanian: singular – apskrities viršininkas, plural – apskrities viršininkai) appointed by the central government in Vilnius. Their primary duty was to ensure that the municipalities obey the laws and the Constitution of Lithuania. They did not have great powers vested in them, and so it was suggested that 10 counties are too much for Lithuania as the two smallest counties administer only four municipalities. Therefore, on 1 July 2010, the county administrations were abolished, but the counties themselves are retained for statistical and reporting purposes.

Modern apskritys should not be confused with apskritys that existed in the independent Lithuania during the interwar period. At that time Lithuania had a two-tier administrative division: apskritys that were subdivided into valsčius. Lithuania now has a three-step division: counties, municipalities, and elderates (apskritys, savivaldybės, and seniūnijos). See subdivisions of Lithuania for details.

Map
This map shows counties as well as municipalities. Eight city municipalities and two municipalities are marked by numbers:

List

See also
 Administrative divisions of Lithuania
 Municipalities (Lithuanian: plural – savivaldybės, singular – savivaldybė)
 Elderships (or wards) (Lithuanian: plural – seniūnijos, singular – seniūnija).
 Seniūnaitija (sub-eldership)
 Cities (Lithuanian: plural – miestai, singular – miestas)
 Towns (Lithuanian: plural – miesteliai, singular – miestelis)

References

 
Subdivisions of Lithuania
Lithuania, Counties
Lithuania 1
Counties, Lithuania
Lithuania geography-related lists